Jihyun Park 박지현 (born 1968) is a British-North Korean Conservative Party politician. She stood as the Conservative candidate as a councilor for the Moorside ward of Bury Metropolitan Borough Council.  Although she did not win, Park is the first known person of North Korean descent to stand for election in the United Kingdom. Park is a North Korean defector, escaping twice from the country, with the first attempt in 1998 resulting in discovery and forced repatriation, and the second attempt in 2008 being successful, and resides in the U.K.  as a citizen.

Early life 
Park was born in North Korea in 1968.

First defection 
Park decided to leave North Korea in 1998 with her brother after being urged by her father. Her brother was thrown out of the military and military officials came looking for him. Park crossed the border and entered into China with her brother. A smuggler promised Park a "well-paid job", instead Park was sold for 5,000 Yuan into a forced marriage with a farmer, with whom she had a child.

Repatriation and imprisonment
Park was subsequently brought back into the prison camps, where she was forced to work on farms.

Second defection 
In year 2004, she again attempted defection, and eventually escaped from North Korea with help of a local broker through mountainous terrain. Once back in China, she stayed a few days in her former shelter, then fled to Beijing with her son, and this time hoped to get help from the South Korean embassy, but later returned back to the border.

Citizenship 
In 2008, she went to the United Kingdom as a refugee. Like many new refugees, she struggled initially with the English language and was unable to communicate with anyone for some time. She eventually gained citizenship and settled permanently. She published a memoir, The Hard Road Out: One Woman's Escape from North Korea, in 2022.

See also 
 North Korean defectors
 2021 United Kingdom local elections

References 

1968 births
Living people
North Korean emigrants
North Korean defectors
Immigrants to England
Naturalised citizens of the United Kingdom